Woldemar Kernig, better known as Vladimir Mikhailovich Kernig (28 June 1840 – 18 April 1917) was a notable Russian and Baltic German internist and neurologist whose medical discoveries saved thousands of people with meningitis. He is best known for his pioneering work on diagnostics. Kernig's sign is named after him.

Biography
Woldemar Kernig was born in St. Petersburg in 1840 to a bookbinder of German origin, Benjamin Mikhail Kernig (1788-1862) and his spouse Wilhelmina Elizaveta (née Person). He received his early education at St. Peter's School from 1852 to 1856.  In 1864, he graduated from Universität Dorpat with the degree of Doctor of Medicine for his dissertation about variations in body temperature in sick and healthy people.  In the same year he began to work at Obukhovskaya Hospital in St. Petersburg, becoming a physician-resident in 1865.

From 1873 to 1890, he was a doctor at a school for deaf-mutes, and from 1881 to 1886 he taught internal medicine in medical courses for women.  From 1884 he was a consultant in internal medicine for the Office of the Institutions of Empress Maria.  He was chairperson of the Society of German Physicians in St. Petersburg.

From 1890 to 1911 he was chief physician at Obukhovskaya Hospital.  In 1911 he entered retirement with the title "Respected Consultant of the Hospital."

He died in Petrograd on April 19, 1917.  He was buried in the Smolensky Lutheran Cemetery.

Kernig's sign
In Kernig's original 1882 publication, he wrote that in patients with meningitis who are seated upright with hips and knees flexed, extending the knee beyond 135 degrees would be painful. Today patients are put into a supine position instead of being seated upright.

Other achievements
In 1904, Kernig described acute pericarditis after severe attacks of angina pectoris and gave an explanation of its pathogenesis, forming part of the foundational research on myocardial infarction.  He was one of the principal organizers of higher women's medical education in Russia and provided initiative for the establishment of the Medical Institute for Women.

See also
 List of Baltic German scientists

References

 Russian State Historical Archive, Collection #272, List #1, Section #48
 Erik Amburger Database: Foreigners in Pre-Revolutionary Russia

Publications 

 Über Milzabscesse nach Febris recurrens. St. Petersburger medicinische Zeitschrift, 1867, XII.
 Über subfebrile Zustände von erheblicher Dauer. Deutsches Archiv für klinische Medicin, Leipzig, 1879, XXIV.
 Über ein krankheitssymptom der acuten meningitis. St. Petersburger Medizinische Woschenschrift, 1882;7:398
 Vorläufiger Bericht über die in der Frauenabteilung des Obuchow-Hospitals nach Koch’scher Methode behandelten Schwindsüchtigen. Deutsches Archiv für klinische Medicin, Leipzig, 1891, XVI.
 Über subcutane Injectionen an den Lungenspitzen ohne pathologische Veränderungen an denselben. Deutsches Archiv für klinische Medicin, Leipzig, 1898; XXXIV.
 Bericht über die mit Tuberculin R im Obuchow-Frauenhospital behandelten Lungenkranken. St. Petersburger medicinische Wochenschrift, 1898; XXIII.
  (1904, № 44)

Further reading
 M. Welz, A. Lindner. Vladimir Kernig (1840–1917). Der Nervenarzt 2003;74:935-936 (German)
 M Krasnianski, P Tacik, T Müller, S Zierz. Attenuation of Kernig’s sign by concomitant hemiparesis: forgotten aspects of a well known clinical test. Journal of Neurology, Neurosurgery, and Psychiatry 2007;78:1413-1414

External links
 http://epub.ub.uni-muenchen.de

1840 births
1917 deaths
People from Liepāja
People from Courland Governorate
Baltic-German people
University of Tartu alumni